Emma Rochlin (born 14 May 1978 in Glasgow) is a female field hockey defender from Scotland. She plays club hockey for Glasgow Western, and made her debut for the Women's National Team in 1999. Rochlin works as a trainee solicitor.

References
 sportscotland

1978 births
Living people
Scottish female field hockey players
Field hockey players at the 2002 Commonwealth Games
Field hockey players at the 2006 Commonwealth Games
Field hockey players from Glasgow
Commonwealth Games competitors for Scotland